Senegambia and Niger was a short-lived administrative unit of the colonial French West Africa possessions, in the region of present-day Niger, Mali and Senegal.

It was formed in 1902, and reorganized in 1904 into Upper Senegal and Niger.

Stamps

Despite its brief existence, the French government still managed to issue postage stamps for the administrative unit, in the form of a version of its Navigation and Commerce series, inscribed "SENEGAMBIE / ET NIGER".

References

See also
 
 
 Sénégambia Confederation

French West Africa
Former colonies in Africa
Former French colonies
French colonisation in Africa
Senegambia
History of Niger
History of Senegal
History of West Africa
States and territories established in 1902
States and territories disestablished in 1904
1902 establishments in French West Africa
1904 disestablishments in French West Africa
France–Niger relations
France–Senegal relations